Cries from the Deep (French: Les pièges de la mer) is a 1982 documentary directed by Jacques Gagné about Jacques Cousteau's exploration of the Grand Banks of Newfoundland.

Filmed in the Gulf of St. Lawrence, Québec, Canada, Halifax, Nova Scotia, Canada, St. Lawrence River, Québec and Ontario, Canada, and the  St. Lawrence Seaway, Québec and Ontario, Canada.

References

External links
Cries from the Deep at National Film Board of Canada
 

1982 films
1982 documentary films
French documentary films
Canadian documentary films
West German films
Documentary films about marine biology
Jacques Cousteau
1980s English-language films
1980s Canadian films
1980s French films